Two ships of the Royal Australian Navy (RAN) have been named HMAS Benalla, after the city of Benalla, Victoria.

 , a Bathurst-class corvette commissioned in 1943 and sold for scrap in 1958
 , a Paluma-class survey motor launch commissioned in 1990 and active as of 2016

Battle honours
One battle honour is carried by ships named HMAS Benalla:
 New Guinea 1943–44

References

Royal Australian Navy ship names